İnönü may refer to.

People with the surname
 İsmet İnönü (1884–1973), Turkish soldier, statesman and the second President of Turkey
 Erdal İnönü (1926–2007), Turkish physicist and politician, and the son of İsmet
 Mevhibe İnönü (1897–1992), First Lady of Turkey from 1938 to 1950 during the presidency of her husband, İsmet

Districts and towns
 İnönü, Eskişehir, a town and district in Eskişehir Province, Turkey
 Sinta, Cyprus, a village in Northern Cyprus whose Turkish name is İnönü

Places
 BJK İnönü Stadium, the home of the football club Beşiktaş J.K. in Istanbul, Turkey
 İnönü University (İnönü Üniversitesi), a university in Malatya, Turkey
 İsmet İnönü Stadium, formerly Çilekli Football Field, a football stadium in Beşiktaş, Istanbul, Turkey home to amateur football matches
 Malatya İnönü Stadium, a multi-use stadium in Malatya, Turkey

Battles
 Battle of İnönü (disambiguation), either of two battles of the Greco-Turkish War (1919–1922), part of Turkish War of Independence:
 First Battle of İnönü, fought between 9 and 11 January 1921 near İnönü in present-day Eskişehir Province, Turkey
 Second Battle of İnönü, fought between 26 and 31 March 1921 near İnönü in present-day Eskişehir Province, Turkey

Ships
 TCG 1. Inönü (S 330), a submarine in the Turkish Navy
 TCG 2. Inönü (S 331),  a submarine in the Turkish Navy
 TCG 2. Inönü (S 333),  a submarine in the Turkish Navy

Turkish-language surnames